Alfredo Vasconcelos is a city in the south of the Brazilian state of Minas Gerais. It belongs to the Barbacena IBGE statistical microregion. It lies just north of Barbacena on the important BR-040 highway, which links Brasília to Rio de Janeiro.

The city was founded on January 1, 1993.

See also
 List of municipalities in Minas Gerais

References

Municipalities in Minas Gerais